Robert Lindstedt and Horia Tecău were the defending champions, but Daniele Bracciali and František Čermák defeated them 6–3, 2–6, [10–8] in the final.

Seeds

Draw

Draw

References
 Main Draw

UNICEF Open - Doubles
2011 - Men's Doubles